Park Chuen-yong (born August 11, 1988) is a South Korean footballer who currently plays for Los Angeles Blues in the USL Professional Division.

References

External links

1988 births
Living people
South Korean footballers
South Korean expatriate footballers
Orange County SC players
Expatriate soccer players in the United States
USL Championship players
Association football forwards